Flashback is the fourth studio album by the Swedish singer Pernilla Wahlgren. Produced by Emilio Ingrosso, it was released on the Sonet label in 1989.

Track listing

Charts

Citations

External links 

 

Pernilla Wahlgren albums
1989 albums